Angelo Staniscia  (born 7 December 1939 in Atessa, Italy) is a former Senator of the Republic. He served in the 13th Legislature from 9 May 1996 until 29 May 2001.

References

1939 births
Living people
Members of the Senate of the Republic (Italy)
People from Atessa
20th-century Italian politicians